Gwagwalada is a local government area in the Federal Capital Territory in Nigeria.

Gwagwalada has an area of 1,043 km2 and a population of 157,770 at the 2006 census.  It is projected to have a 6.26% growth between 2020 and 2025, the largest increase on the African continent.

History
Before the creation of Federal Capital Territory, Gwagwalada was under the Kwali District of the former Abuja emirate now Suleja emirate.
Gwagwalada was created on 15 October 1984. Its official population figure of  158,618 people at the 2006 census. The relocation of the seat of government from Lagos to Abuja in 1992 and the recent demolition of illegal structures within the Federal City Center brought a massive influx of people into the area being one of the fastest growing urban centers in the Federal Capital Territory. The population of the area has grown to over 1,000,000 people. Gwagwalada is one of the five local government areas of the Federal Capital Territory of Nigeria, together with Abaji, Kuje, Bwari, and Kwali; the Federal Capital Territory also includes the city of Abuja. Gwagwalada has an area of 1069.589 km2.

Administrative structure
Gwagwalada is administered by an Executive Chairman elected through adult suffrage. The Council is composed of ten elected councilors representing the ten wards of the Council, namely: Zuba, Ibwa, Dobi Kutunku, Tunga Maje, Gwako, Paikonkore, Ikwa, Quarters & Central

The postal code of the area is 902101.

The Chairman of the Gwagwalada is Alhaji Abubakar Jibrin Giri Gwagwalada is where the mini campus of the University of Abuja is located. School For The Gifted is also located in the area.

References

External links

 Official Website

Local Government Areas in the Federal Capital Territory (Nigeria)
Populated places in the Federal Capital Territory (Nigeria)